A. Gary Klesch (born 1947) is an Anglo-American entrepreneur, who in 1990 founded the Klesch Group, a global industrial company, based in Geneva, Switzerland, which he owns and chairs. The Klesch Group of companies has interests in metals, mining, oil and gas, power generation, chemicals and other traditional "heavy" industries.  Klesch specializes in principal investing in companies that are operating below their full potential. Klesch is a leading proponent of "value investing", and speaks regularly to professional audiences around the world as an expert in the field of business restructuring, recovery and growth.  According to The Economist, "Europe needs people like Mr. Klesch.  Its protected firms have been able to ignore basic business principles for too long. With fresh money, Mr. Klesch brings discipline and fresh ideas."

Early life 
Klesch was born in Cleveland, Ohio in 1947 and educated by Jesuits. He graduated from John Carroll University in 1968 with a B.A. in Political Science.

Career 
After finishing his studies, Klesch's first job was at Paine Webber in Cleveland, as a margin clerk. He was tasked with sorting slips of paper in the back office and earned less than $10,000 a year.

In 1969, aged 22, Klesch joined McDonald & Company, then one of the largest regional investment banking firms, based in Cleveland, Ohio, as an associate. In his interview with founder Bertram McDonald, Klesch was told that if he worked hard, he would be a Partner in fifteen to twenty years' time. After leaving the interview, his immediate reaction was, "No way, no way I'm going to wait that long" and plunged into his job in the syndicate department. Two years later, aged 24, Klesch was made McDonald & Company's youngest-ever Partner.

Klesch then came to the attention of Bill Simon, who had just been appointed Secretary of the Treasury under President Gerald Ford, and in 1975, aged 28, he was appointed Director of Capital Markets Policy. In this role he contributed to the development of a new model of financial regulation and in effect became Washington's man in charge of Wall Street. Klesch's responsibilities included developing the legislation that set in motion the deregulation of the securities and financial services industries in the United States and which ultimately resulted in Wall Street's "Big Bang".  During this time, he also travelled to Europe, Japan and the Middle East to talk about capital markets and deregulation.
Whilst at the Treasury Department, Klesch also served as the Ford Administration's representative in negotiations leading to US Government loans and guarantees to various financially troubled entities, including Lockheed and New York City.  He also served as the US Government's representative on the Board of the United States Railway Association, where he played a significant role in the negotiation and reorganization of troubled railroad companies, most notably the Penn Central Corporation, which collapsed in the early 1970s and was then the world's largest insolvency.  Additionally, he was responsible for finding private finance for the space shuttle.

In 1978, after two and half years in Washington, Klesch took a sabbatical and then joined the management of Smith Barney Harris Upham & International Smith Barney Harris Upham & Company, Inc. | Better Business Bureau Profile, the Wall Street securities house, in Paris. He was given the role of Director responsible for Middle East development.

In 1980, he was appointed President of the brokerage firm Dean Witter Reynolds Overseas Ltd. in London, where he was responsible for all of the firms' international activities.  Under his presidency, the firm grew from 10 employees to over 200 and steadily rose up the Eurobond league tables. In 1982, Klesch won the Eurobond's best syndicate manager award.
Setting up Dean Witter Overseas had given Klesch the confidence he needed, and two years after joining, Klesch decided to leave to create his own investment company.

Quadrex 
In 1983, Klesch set up Quadrex, which started in the Euromarkets but soon moved into acquisition finance, leverage buyouts and restructurings.  The firm had operations in both London and New York. The firm enjoyed success quickly, with Klesch commenting as Chairman a year later that "we are very pleased with our accomplishments during our first year of operation.  We have been very fortunate to attract both clients and personnel who appreciate the importance of innovative customer service in the international capital markets and who have helped us begin to develop a reputation in fulfilling these needs." The company reported net assets of £5.3million operating with a share capital of £4million.

Quadrex Holdings first subsidiary, Quadrex Securities Ltd. specialized in international financial transactions.  Its first deal as lead manager was an issue for the U.S conglomerate Transamerica of "Eurotreasury" warrants. This was an attempt to create a vehicle for trading in Europe what would have been in effect options on long-term US Treasury Bonds. In spite of the issue being heavily advertised on the day, the offer was cancelled several hours later as demand proved insufficient. However, two days later, Merrill Lynch Capital Markets and Salomon Brothers Inc. unit of Philbro-Salmon duplicated the Transamerica Treasury warrant offering in almost every aspect except the price. After duplicating Klesch's idea, Hans Georg Hofmann Hans Georg Hofmann, executive director of Merrill Lynch International said "He (Klesch) was the first who had the guts to try it but in circumstances that made it difficult to succeed. In 1987, Klesch was recognized as the acknowledged developer of "EuroTreasury" Warrants with the Institutional Investor award for best idea.
Following on from its first deal, Quadrex Securities Ltd. managed a series of other deals in 1984, including the $50 million 10 year issue for Equitable Bancorp and its first international deal, Citicorp's $100 million offering of two year extendable bonds. By early 1985, Klesch had begun to look beyond Eurobond trading and started to undertake a series of acquisitions for his investment group including the first leveraged buyout of a public company in the United Kingdom, the tender offer for R P Martin PLC, one of the largest foreign exchange brokers in the world.
Also in 1985, Quadrex Securities Ltd., announced the offering of the first Euro-sterling zero coupon obligations backed by United Kingdom government securities, a new financial instrument to the securities market.  The securities, known as STAGS (Sterling Transferable Accruing Government Securities), were issued in the Euro-sterling sector of the Eurobond market.  However, the technique which had proved successful in the United States failed to attract enough attention and was withdrawn shortly after they were launched. After this, Klesch bought Polymer Corp, a maker of plastic parts, in 1986, and BoreSteel, a steel company in 1987 in an attempt to diversify Quadrex away from finance. He also drew up a plan for a consortium bid to break up Pearson PLC, the conglomerate that owned the Financial Times, although theoretically sound the plan was leaked to the media and appeared superficial and therefore ultimately failed. By 1990 Quadrex Holdings had been wound down and was officially dissolved in 1999. It was a victim of the decline in the bond market and had also become entangled in a lawsuit with British & Commonwealth Holdings PLC over the acquisition of the money broking side of financial service group, Mercantile House.

Klesch Group 
In 1990, Klesch founded Klesch & Company Limited to specialize in distressed and turnaround investing. During the last decade, Klesch & Co. has been involved in a number of high-profile deals, and today is a global industrials commodities business with three divisions specializing in the production and trading of chemicals, metals and oil. It employs more than 4,500 people across 40 locations in over 16 different countries. Its turnover is in excess $5 billion.

Corporate activity 
 1993: acquisition of DAF, Dutch truck manufacturer
 1996: acquisition of TC Farries, Scottish bookseller
 1998: acquisition of Knickerbox, a British lingerie chain, and of Myrys, a French shoemaker
 2009: acquisition of Delfzijl steelworks in Netherlands and of Heide refinery in Germany (from Shell)
 July 2012: acquisition of Kem One, vinyls activities of the French Arkema Group
 February 2013: acquisition of Groupe Leali, an Italian steel producer
 January 2022: acquisition of Kalundborg Refinery and its terminal located in Hedehusene in Denmark (from Equinor)

Criticism 
Unions and European local politicians fear the worst from Gary Klesch, as shown by the example of unions at Alcoa's, Sardinian steel factory, whose employees protested against a possible takeover by Klesh & Company Limited. This is due to its reputation as a "vulture capitalist" conveyed in the press and the closing of several acquisitions made by Gary Klesch for which the businessman pledged to boost the activity, as the example of Kem One company.

In 2012, Klesch & Co bought the vinyl business division of Arkema for one symbolic euro, which he later renamed "Kem One S.A." Klesch claimed that the raw materials industry is subject to a bright future and said that the group Klesch & Co had the expertise to improve the efficiency of industrial processes and trade with amenities. In the transaction, Arkema took charge of its 587 million loss from the pole and offered a treasury of 100 million euros to help stimulate activity. 8 months later, the company was declared insolvent, threatening more than 1,300 jobs. French unions suspect him to have placed Arkema money in its financial holdings registered in Jersey, Malta or Bermuda.

References 

Living people
American businesspeople
1947 births
John Carroll University alumni